Maha Ghosananda (full title Samdech Preah Maha Ghosananda - ; ; May 23, 1913 – March 12, 2007) was a highly revered Cambodian Buddhist monk in the Theravada tradition, who served as the Patriarch (Sangharaja) of Cambodian Buddhism during the Khmer Rouge period and post-communist transition period of Cambodian history. His Pali monastic name, 'Mahā Ghosānanda', means "great joyful proclaimer". He was well known in Cambodia for his annual peace marches.

Early life and education
He was born Va Yav in Takéo Province, Cambodia in 1913 to a farming family in the Mekong Delta plains. From an early age he showed great interest in religion, and began to serve as a temple boy at the age of eight years old. He was greatly impressed by the monks with whom he served, and at age fourteen received novice ordination.  He studied Pali scriptures in the local temple high school, then went on to complete his higher education at the monastic universities in Phnom Penh and Battambang.

He was sponsored by Chuon Nath to travel to India to pursue a doctorate in Pali at Nalanda University in Bihar, at that time an institute known under the name of Nava Nālandā Mahāvihāra. While in India, he studied under the Japanese monk Nichidatsu Fujii, founder of the Japanese peace-oriented sect Nipponzan Myohoji and a former associate of Mahatma Gandhi.

In 1965, Maha Ghosananda left India to study meditation under Ajahn Dhammadaro, a famous meditation master of the Thai Forest Tradition. He remained with Ajahn Dhammadaro at his forest hermitage in southern Thailand, Wat Chai Na (located near Nakhon Si Thammarat),for eleven years.

Khmer Rouge era 
In 1978, Maha Ghosananda traveled to the refugee camps near the Thai-Cambodian border to begin ministering to the first refugees who filtered across the border.

Maha Ghosananda's appearance in the refugee camps raised a stir among the refugees who had not seen a monk for years. The Cambodian refugees openly wept as Maha Ghosananda chanted the ancient and familiar sutras that had been the bedrock of traditional Cambodian culture before Year Zero. He distributed photocopied Buddhist scriptures among the refugees, as protection and inspiration for the battered people.

When the Pol Pot regime collapsed in 1979, Maha Ghosananda was one of only 3,000 Cambodian Buddhist monks alive, out of more than 60,000 at the start of the reign of terror in 1976. Throughout 1979 Maha Ghosananda established wats in refugee camps along the Thai-Cambodian border, ordaining monks against the orders of the Thai military. He also founded more than 30 temples for Cambodian refugees living in Canada and the United States.

His entire family, and countless friends and disciples, were massacred by the Khmer Rouge.

Restoration 
Maha Ghosananda served as a key figure in post-Communist Cambodia, helping to restore the nation state and to revive Cambodian Buddhism. In 1980, he served as a representative of the Cambodian nation-in-exile to the United Nations.

In 1980 Maha Ghosananda and the Reverend Peter L. Pond formed the Inter-Religious Mission for Peace in Cambodia. Together they located hundreds of surviving monks and nuns in Cambodia so that they could renew their vows and take leadership roles in Cambodian temples around the world. In June 1980 the Thai Government decided to forcibly repatriate thousands of refugees. Pond and the Preah Maha Ghosananda organized a protest against the forced repatriation of refugees from Sa Kaeo Refugee Camp.

In 1988, Maha Ghosananda was elected as sanghreach (sangharaja) by a small gathering of exiled monks in Paris. He agreed to accept the position provisionally, until a complete, independent monastic hierarchy could be established in Cambodia.  At the time, Venerable Tep Vong was the titular head of a unified Cambodian sangha, having been appointed to the position in 1981 by the Vietnamese-backed People's Republic of Kampuchea.

In 1989, he returned full-time to Cambodia, taking up residence at Wat Sampeou Meas in Phnom Penh.

Dhammayietra 
In 1992, during the first year of the United Nations sponsored peace agreement, Maha Ghosananda led the first nationwide Dhammayietra, a peace march or pilgrimage, across Cambodia in an effort to begin restoring the hope and spirit of the Cambodian people.

The 16-day, 125-mile peace walk passed through territory still littered with landmines from the Khmer Rouge. The initial walk consisted of approximately 350 monks, nuns, and lay Buddhists who escorted around 100 Cambodians from refugee camps to their villages in Cambodia. This was carried out without official permission from Thai or Cambodian officials to cross the border. By the time the march reached Phnom Penh it had grown in size significantly, and drew coverage from the international media. In recognition of his contributions, King Sihanouk bestowed on Maha Goshananda the title samdech song santipeap ('Leader of Religion and Peace') later that year.

The Dhammayietra became an annual walk which Maha Ghosananda led a number of times, despite the danger during the Khmer Rouge years. In 1995, the Dhammayietra consisted of almost 500 Cambodian Buddhist monks, nuns and precept-taking lay people. They were joined by The Interfaith Pilgrimage for Peace and Life. Together the two groups crossed Cambodia from the Thai border all the way to Vietnam, spending several days walking through Khmer Rouge-controlled territory along the way.  For his teachings on non-violence and establishing Buddhist temples throughout the world that root his exiled people in their religion of peace, he was presented with the Peace Abbey Courage of Conscience Award.

He had been called "the Gandhi of Cambodia." Maha Ghosananda was nominated for the Nobel Peace Prize by the chair of the U.S. Senate Foreign Relations Committee, Claiborne Pell.  He was again nominated in 1995, 1996, and 1997 for his work in bringing peace to Cambodia. He also acted as an adviser to the Buddhist Peace Fellowship and resided part-time in the Palelai Buddhist Temple and Monastery in Philadelphia, Pennsylvania, United States.

He died in Northampton, Massachusetts on March 12, 2007.

Awards and recognitions 
 1992 - The Rafto Prize
 1998 - Niwano Peace Prize
 1998 - Courage of Conscience Award

Books 
Maha Ghosananda Step By Step

See also
 Dhammayietra
 Buddhism in Cambodia
 Supreme Patriarch of Cambodia

Footnotes

References

Further reading
Santidhammo Bhikkhu [Buddha of the Battlefield: Life of Maha Ghosanandahttp://www.ghosananda.org/bio_book.html]
Text transcribed from the book “Step by Step”

External links 

 Site dedicated to preserving his memory and creating a mausoleum and temple in his honor.
 Cambodia's Nobel Nominee on peace and suffering
 The Serene Life - 20 minute interview with Maha Ghosananda
 Maha Ghosananda's biography in English Language
 Maha Ghosananda's biography in Khmer Language
 Maha Ghosananda's biography in German Language
 Maha Ghosananda's Facebook
 Maha Ghosananda's Dharma Talks
 Interview of Maha Ghosananda by Ram Dass

Theravada Buddhist monks
Engaged Buddhists
Humanitarians
1913 births
2007 deaths
Cambodian Buddhist monks
Cambodian Theravada Buddhists
People from Takéo province
20th-century Buddhist monks